The MICrONS program (Machine Intelligence from Cortical Networks) is a five-year project run by the United States government through the Intelligence Advanced Research Projects Activity (IARPA) with the goal of reverse engineering one cubic millimeter—spanning many petabytes of volumetric data—of a rodent's brain tissue and use insights from its study to improve machine learning and artificial intelligence by constructing a connectome.  The program is part of the White House BRAIN Initiative.

Teams 
The program has set up three independent teams, each of which will take a different approach towards the goal. The teams are led by David Cox of Harvard University, Tai Sing Lee of Carnegie Mellon University; and jointly by Andreas Tolias and Xaq Pitkow of the Baylor College of Medicine, Clay Reid of the Allen Institute for Brain Science, and Sebastian Seung of Princeton University.

The Cox team has aimed to build a three-dimensional map of the neural connections within the source tissue block using reconstructions from electron micrographs.

Technology and infrastructure for storing petabyte-scale volumetric data, including a cloud-based database, bossDB, were developed by the Johns Hopkins Applied Physics Lab.

Approach 
The part of the brain chosen for the project is part of the visual cortex, chosen as a representative of a task – visual perception – that is easy for animals and human beings to perform, but has turned out to be extremely difficult to emulate with computers.

Cox's team is attempting to build a three dimensional mapping of the actual neural connections, based on fine electron micrographs. Lee's team is taking a DNA barcoding approach, in attempt to map the brain circuits by barcode-labelling of each neuron, and cross-synapse barcode connections. Tolias's team is taking a data-driven approach, assuming the brain creates statistical expectations about the world it sees.

References

External links 
 MICrONS Homepage

Neuroinformatics
Neuroimaging